Aristeo "Aries" Dimaunahan (born March 21, 1978) is a Filipino former professional basketball player who is the assistant coach of the Blackwater Bossing in the Philippine Basketball Association (PBA), and is the currently the head coach of the NU Lady Bulldogs of the University Athletic Association of the Philippines (UAAP).

Early life and career 

He attended Grace Kindergarten, Canossa Academy and graduated from De La Salle-Lipa in 1994. He also attended the University of Santo Tomas after high school.

Playing career 
He played in the Philippine Basketball League in his early years before being drafted by the Barangay Ginebra Kings in the 2002 PBA Draft. He was also recognized by then-Mayor Vilma Santos as the second PBA player from his hometown in Lipa City after Melchor Teves, who also graduated from De La Salle Lipa.

In 2006, Dimaunahan was also part of a controversial PBA seven player trade involving Rudy Hatfield, Billy Mamaril, Rafi Reavis, and Ervin Sotto. Because sister teams such as Ginebra and Coca-Cola are not allowed to trade directly, nor can their under-teams, which applied to San Miguel Beer and Purefoods. In order to circumvent the rules, a third team, Air21 was involved in the trade, which ultimately sent Dimaunahan to Air21.

After playing two seasons with the Barako Bull Energy Boosters, he was signed by the Alaska Aces as a free agent during the 2011 Governors Cup. In 2012, while with the San Miguel Beermen, he was one of five players suspended for taking place in a Basket-Brawl involving the Beermen and the entire bench of the AirAsia Philippine Patriots.

Coaching career 
After retiring as a player, Dimaunahan began a coaching career, with stints both professionally and in women's college basketball. In 2015 he served as an assistant coach with the Blackwater Elite, and in 2017 he became an assistant coach for the Lady Bulldogs. In 2015, Dimanauhan was an assistant coach for Patrick Aquino and the Philippines women's national basketball team.

In 2022, after Aquino decided to focus on the women's national team, Dimaunahan was promoted as NU's head coach. Later that year, he led the Lady Bulldogs to their seventh consecutive UAAP title.

Personal life 
Dimaunahan is married to former child star Jane Zaleta, where he had two children.

References 

1978 births
Living people
Alaska Aces (PBA) players
Barako Bull Energy Boosters players
Barako Bull Energy players
Barangay Ginebra San Miguel draft picks
Barangay Ginebra San Miguel players
Basketball players from Batangas
Filipino men's basketball players
People from Lipa, Batangas
Powerade Tigers players
Shooting guards
University of Santo Tomas alumni
Blackwater Bossing coaches